A coup de grâce is a finishing blow.

Coup de Grâce may also refer to:

 Coup de Grâce (1969 film), an Argentinian comedy
 Coup de Grâce (1976 film), a film by Volker Schlöndorff
 "Coup de Grace" (CSI), an episode of the TV series CSI: Crime Scene Investigation
 Coup de Grâce (novel), a novel by Marguerite Yourcenar, basis for the 1976 film
 Coup de Grâce, a technique in professional wrestling

In music:
 Coup de Grâce (Ja Rule album)
 Coup de Grace (Miles Kane album), 2018
 Coup de Grâce (Mink DeVille album)
 Coup de Grace (Orange Goblin album)
 Coup de Grace (The Plasmatics album)
 Coup de Grace (The Stranglers album)
 Coup de Grace (Treat album)
 Coup de Grâce (Best of Koop 1997–2007), an album
 Coup de Grâce, a power electronics music project by Michael Moynihan
 "Coup de grâce", part of the Call of Duty: Modern Warfare 2 soundtrack by Hans Zimmer
 "Coup de Grâce", a song by Phinehas from the album Till the End